Joseph Alton Byrd (born November 3, 1957) is an American-British former professional basketball player who is the Senior Vice President-Growth Properties/Community Relations for BSE Global Long Island Nets of the NBA G League and Nets Gaming of NBA 2K League.

He grew up in the San Francisco area, where he was a high school basketball star. He continued to be a basketball star at Columbia University, where he was one of the best point guards in the country in spite of his small stature. He holds the school records for career assists (526) and assists in a single season (210).

After receiving his bachelor's degree from Columbia College in 1979, he attended the Boston Celtics rookie camp, but, suffering with a foot injury, he did not get a contract and joined Crystal Palace of the British Basketball League. During his rookie season, he led Palace to a 50–5 record. He later started for teams in Edinburgh, Manchester, Guildford and Kingston. In 1984 he became a British citizen and made his debut for England.

Off the court, he pursued a variety of broadcasting and business ventures, including a weekly show on BBC Radio 5 Live dedicated to American sports.  From 1997 to 1999, he was the general manager of the London Monarchs of NFL Europe, while there he guided the team to rebrand as the England Monarchs, before ultimately folding after a 1998 season that ended with a 3–7 record, after three straight 4–6 tallies. They were replaced by the Berlin Thunder in 1999.

In 1999, he returned to the United States to be a Vice President of Strategic Alliances for the Sacramento Kings.  In 2002,He then founded a management consulting company, Clear Focus Consulting. In September 2013, the Atlanta Dream hired him as the Chief Revenue Officer. On March 24, 2016, the Brooklyn Nets hired Alton Byrd as the Vice President of Business Operations.

References

External links

British Basketball League stats

1958 births
Living people
American expatriate basketball people in the United Kingdom
American expatriate sportspeople in Scotland
American expatriate sportspeople in England
American football executives
American men's basketball players
Basketball players from San Francisco
Boston Celtics draft picks
British men's basketball players
British Basketball League players
British sports broadcasters
Columbia College (New York) alumni
Columbia Lions men's basketball players
Point guards
Sacramento Kings executives
Naturalised citizens of the United Kingdom
Brooklyn Nets executives
BBC radio presenters